In graph theory, a book graph (often written  ) may be any of several kinds of graph formed by multiple cycles sharing an edge.

Variations
One kind, which may be called a quadrilateral book, consists of p quadrilaterals sharing a common edge (known as the "spine" or "base" of the book). That is, it is a Cartesian product of a star and a single edge. The 7-page book graph of this type provides an example of a graph with no harmonious labeling.

A second type, which might be called a triangular book, is the complete tripartite graph K1,1,p.  It is a graph consisting of  triangles sharing a common edge.  A book of this type is a split graph.  
Triangular books form one of the key building blocks of line perfect graphs.

The term "book-graph" has been employed for other uses.  Barioli used it to mean a graph composed of a number of arbitrary subgraphs having two vertices in common.  (Barioli did not write  for his book-graph.)

Within larger graphs
Given a graph , one may write  for the largest book (of the kind being considered) contained within .

Theorems on books
Denote the Ramsey number of two triangular books by  This is the smallest number  such that for every -vertex graph, either the graph itself contains  as a subgraph, or its complement graph contains  as a subgraph.

 If , then .
 There exists a constant  such that  whenever .
Then every graph on  vertices and  edges contains a (triangular) .

References

Parametric families of graphs
Planar graphs